Morani may refer to:

People
 Alessia Morani (born 1976), Italian politician
 Aly Morani, Indian film producer
 Karim Morani, Indian film producer
 Lucky Morani, Indian fashion designer, model, and actress
 Zoa Morani (born 1988), Indian model and actress

Places 
 Morani, Studeničani, North Macedonia
 Morani (Tutin), Serbia